Plevna is a town in Fallon County, Montana, United States. The population was 179 at the 2020 census.

Plevna was founded in 1909 along the Milwaukee Road transcontinental rail line known as the Pacific Extension. Bulgarian railroad workers named the town after the city of Pleven in Bulgaria.

Geography
Plevna is located at  (46.416323, -104.517842). U.S. Route 12 passes through town. It is 12 miles from Baker.

Climate
According to the Köppen Climate Classification system, Plevna has a semi-arid climate, abbreviated "BSk" on climate maps.

Demographics

2010 census
As of the census of 2010, there were 162 people, 65 households, and 41 families residing in the town. The racial makeup of the town was 95.7% White, 0.6% African American, 1.9% Asian, 0.6% from other races, and 1.2% from two or more races. Hispanic or Latino of any race were 1.9% of the population.

There were 65 households, of which 35.4% had children under the age of 18 living with them, 60.0% were married couples living together, 1.5% had a female householder with no husband present, 1.5% had a male householder with no wife present, and 36.9% were non-families. 32.3% of all households were made up of individuals, and 16.9% had someone living alone who was 65 years of age or older. The average household size was 2.49 and the average family size was 3.24.

The median age in the town was 37.3 years. 30.2% of residents were under the age of 18; 4.3% were between the ages of 18 and 24; 22.9% were from 25 to 44; 24% were from 45 to 64; and 18.5% were 65 years of age or older. The gender makeup of the town was 47.5% male and 52.5% female.

2000 census
As of the census of 2000, there were 138 people, 63 households, and 40 families residing in the town. The population density was 301.4 people per square mile (115.8/km2). There were 81 housing units at an average density of 176.9 per square mile (68.0/km2). The racial makeup of the town was 97.83% White and 2.17% Asian. Hispanic or Latino of any race were 1.45% of the population.

There were 63 households, out of which 30.2% had children under the age of 18 living with them, 54.0% were married couples living together, 3.2% had a female householder with no husband present, and 36.5% were non-families. 34.9% of all households were made up of individuals, and 14.3% had someone living alone who was 65 years of age or older. The average household size was 2.19 and the average family size was 2.78.

In the town, the population was spread out, with 24.6% under the age of 18, 2.9% from 18 to 24, 31.2% from 25 to 44, 21.7% from 45 to 64, and 19.6% who were 65 years of age or older. The median age was 40 years. For every 100 females there were 115.6 males. For every 100 females age 18 and over, there were 108.0 males.

The median income for a household in the town was $27,917, and the median income for a family was $33,333. Males had a median income of $26,875 versus $21,667 for females. The per capita income for the town was $14,360. There were 6.5% of families and 8.3% of the population living below the poverty line, including 16.7% of under eighteens and none of those over 64.

Education
Plevna School District educates students from kindergarten through 12th grade. They are known as the Cougars. Plevna High School is a Class C school (less than 108 students) which helps determine athletic competitions.

Notable people
 Vedie Himsl, baseball coach and scout, was born here. Himsl coached for the Chicago Cubs from 1960-1964.

References

Towns in Fallon County, Montana
1909 establishments in Montana
Populated places established in 1909